The E. V. Cooke House is a historic house located northeast of Jerome, Idaho. The lava rock house was constructed in 1919 by stonemason H. T. Pugh. The bungalow-style home features a gable roof with exposed rafters, a gabled dormer with bracketed eaves, and a full porch. The home is similar in style to Pugh's E. C. Gleason House, which he built in Jerome the prior year.

The house was added to the National Register of Historic Places on September 8, 1983.

References

Houses on the National Register of Historic Places in Idaho
Houses completed in 1919
Houses in Jerome County, Idaho
National Register of Historic Places in Jerome County, Idaho